"Freakit" is a song co-written and performed by Das EFX, issued as the lead single from their second studio album Straight Up Sewaside. In 1993, the song reached #1 on the Billboard dance chart, as well as peaking at #43 on the Billboard Hot 100.

Music video

The official music video for the song was directed by Wayne Isham.

Chart positions

References

External links
 

1993 singles
1993 songs
Das EFX songs
East West Records singles
Music videos directed by Wayne Isham